ROCK'N Vodka is a sugarcane vodka beverage, founded by Andy Roiniotis, Isabelle Roiniotis, and Denny Trakas in 2019. The brand is now co-owned by Rick Nielsen of Cheap Trick. Vodka made from sugarcane is atypical when compared to traditional corn, wheat, or potato vodkas. ROCK'N Vodka is distilled four times and unaged.

History
ROCK'N Vodka was originally produced by Barnstormer Distillery in Rockford, Illinois. The brand moved to Rush Creek Distilling in Harvard, Illinois in December 2020. Sales and distribution expanded after winning the Double Gold award in the New York International Spirits Competition  Double Gold and Gold at the 2022 Proof Awards, Silver award in the 2022 Bartender Spirits Awards, Silver in the 2022 USA Spirits Ratings  and the Silver award in the San Francisco World Spirits Competition.

Distribution to the states of California, Texas, Washington, Georgia, Alberta, British Columbia, Illinois, Iowa, Oklahoma, Wisconsin, Nevada, and Florida. ROCK'N Vodka is officially partnered with Hard Rock Cafe in the United States, the first feature being at the Hard Rock Rockford Casino 

Shannon MacDonald was responsible for creating the brand's iconic artwork. ROCK'N Vodka was trademarked in February 2022.

The company was featured three times on the Rachael Ray Show: in the Italian Greyhound, A.K.A "I Want You To Drink Me,", in the Be Still My Beating Heart Cocktail for their Valentine's Day 2023 episode and in the Roman Holiday Cocktail for their G.O.A.T (Greatest of All Time) episodes. Also, it worked with Light-Heavyweight fighter Corey Anderson (fighter). The brand can be seen Josh Bilicki's number 99 car and is playable on PlayStation & Xbox on Nascar Heat 5.

References

External links
website

Companies based in Illinois
American vodkas